The Michael Remp House is a historic house located at 42 Godfrey Lane in Greenlawn, Suffolk County, New York.

Description and history 
It consists of a -story, five-bay wide, shingled dwelling, flanked by smaller -story, five-bay shingled wings. The earliest section of the house was built in about 1770. Also on the property are three contributing barns.

It was added to the National Register of Historic Places on September 26, 1985.

References

Houses on the National Register of Historic Places in New York (state)
Houses completed in 1770
Houses in Suffolk County, New York
National Register of Historic Places in Suffolk County, New York
1770 establishments in the Province of New York